Sriramapura  is a town in the southern state of Karnataka, India. It is located in the Hosadurga taluk of Chitradurga district in Karnataka.

History
Srirampura has its own history, the town having the 13th century historical temple called Veerabadreshwara temple was closed due to Sultan's attack from that time has been open now.

Demographics

As of 2001 India census, Sriramapura had a population of 5,174 with 2,639 males and 2,535 females.

Temples
Srirampura is famous for the Sri Banashankari Temple. Sri Banashankari Devi is one of the avatars of Goddess Sri Parvati Devi. Sharannavarathri Puja ceremonies are held once in a year for nine days during the Navarathri festival. Many devotees from Bangalore belonging to Devanga Community and people from different parts of far away places from Karnataka state visit Sri Banashankari Devi Temple during these nine days.
Gavirangapura, 3 km from Srirampura, Hosadurga taluk, has a very well known temple of Sri Lakshmi Gaviranganatha Swamy the lord is in the form of Kurma the second avatar of Lord Vishnu. It is one of the two known temples of Kurma avatar of Lord Vishnu in India. The other one is at Srikurmam 15 km from Srikakulam, Andhra Pradesh.
Guru Parappa Swamy Mutt at Sriramapura
Guruji, a native of north Karnataka, came down to Chitradurga district in the late 18th century. By nature he was not a guru but would give suggestions to persons who asked. Many people in his lifetime worshiped him as living god. Till today we find his divine presence and helping devotees to over come their difficulties. The annual ratothsava is held every April.

References

External links
 http://Chitradurga.nic.in/

Villages in Chitradurga district